Miguel Molina may refer to:

 Miguel Molina (wrestler) (born 1991), Cuban wrestler; see Wrestling at the 1995 Pan American Games
 Miguel Molina (racing driver) (born 1989), professional racing driver from Spain
 Miguel Molina (swimmer) (born 1984), swimmer from the Philippines

See also
 Miguel Molinos (1628–1696), Spanish mystic